Sharpe and Paley was a partnership of two architects who practised from an office in Lancaster, Lancashire, England, between 1845 and 1856. Founded by Edmund Sharpe in 1835, the practice flourished for more than a century, until 1946. It had grown to become the largest in northwest England by the late 19th century and was responsible for the design of many important buildings, especially churches. The two formed a partnership in 1845, following which Sharpe took an increasing interest in activities outside the practice. By 1847 Paley was responsible for most of the firm's work, and was carrying out commissions independently from at least 1849. Sharpe formally withdrew from the practice in 1851, although it continued to trade as Sharpe and Paley until 1856.

During Sharpe's time as sole principal the practice was involved mainly with ecclesiastical work, although it also undertook commissions for country houses and smaller projects.  The type of work undertaken by the Sharpe and Paley partnership continued much as before, mostly on churches: designing new churches, repairing, rebuilding, and making additions and alterations to existing ones.  Many of the alterations to medieval churches were done in the course of restoration work, in an effort to return the structure to its main style, or to what the architect considered to have been the best medieval style, usually that of the 13th and 14th centuries.   New churches designed during the partnership include St Nicholas, Wrea Green and Christ Church, Bacup.  Work on existing churches included rebuilding most of All Saints, Wigan, and restoring St Oswald, Warton.  Most of the practice's ecclesiastical work was for the Church of England, but Sharpe and Paley also designed a new Roman Catholic church, St Mary, Yealand Conyers.

The work carried out on country houses included Wennington Hall, a new house, and additions and alterations to existing houses, including Hornby Castle and Dalton Castle.  Other non-ecclesiastical commissions included converting the former gatehouse of Furness Abbey into the Furness Abbey Hotel, designing the North Western Hotel in Morecambe, a new charity school for girls in Lancaster now known as Windermere House, additional buildings for Lancaster Royal Grammar School, new militia barracks in Lancaster, and alterations to the Grand Theatre in Lancaster.  Most of the work undertaken by the partnership was local, in Lancashire and the neighbouring counties, but some commissions were further afield; new churches were built in Warwickshire, County Durham, and North Yorkshire.  Alterations were made to existing churches in North Yorkshire, the East Riding of Yorkshire, County Durham, and Leicestershire.  The practice also designed a music hall in Settle, North Yorkshire, and Newfield Hall, a new country house in Airton, North Yorkshire.

This list contains the major works executed by the practice from the creation of the partnership of Sharpe and Paley in 1845 until its formal change of name in 1856.  For details of the works carried out by the practice during other periods see Lists of works by Sharpe, Paley and Austin.  For more information about the practice as a whole, see Sharpe, Paley and Austin.

Key

Works

Notes and references
Notes

Citations

Sources

 

Lists of buildings and structures by architect

Sharpe and Paley